Theodor Tallmeister (9 April 1889 Tartu – 3 February 1947 Uppsala) was an Estonian politician. He was a member of II Riigikogu.

References

1889 births
1947 deaths
Politicians from Tartu
People from Kreis Dorpat
Estonian Lutheran clergy
National Liberal Party (Estonia) politicians
Estonian Labour Party politicians
National Centre Party (Estonia) politicians
Members of the Riigikogu, 1923–1926
Members of the Riigikogu, 1926–1929
Members of the Riigikogu, 1929–1932
Members of the Riigikogu, 1932–1934
University of Tartu alumni
Estonian World War II refugees
Estonian emigrants to Sweden